Silver Sprocket is a San Francisco-based indie comics publisher and independent record label, founded in 2007 by Avi Ehrlich of  Springman Records.  In addition to publishing records and comics, Silver Sprocket also supports a range of independent musicians and other community-based initiatives.

Overview 

Silver Sprocket is an anti-professional art crew, comic and zine publisher, record label, and "all-around raging dumpster fire." Ehrlich told The Comics Journal that the community-based model of the company is founded in anarchist politics: "It’s very shaped by anarchist world views and specifically the Bay Area punk rock scene which was a very hippieish community of mutual aid and helping each other out and not waiting for permission from some corporation to exist." Comics critics have noted the publisher's high production values differentiates Silver Sprocket from other zine publishers. "Its political values may be DIY and anti-establishment, but its attention to production values and design sets it apart from traditional, home-made zines." Silver Sprocket is known for publishing comics about punk culture, mental illness, queer lives, and people of color. 

Silver Sprocket opened their first  retail location in December 2017 at 1685 Haight St, San Francisco. In 2021, Ari Yarwood was hired as Silver Sprocket's first managing editor.

Musicians 

The following musicians have released albums under the Silver Sprocket label:

 Andrew Jackson Jihad
 Ashtray
 Big D and the Kids Table
 Blackbird Raum
 Blatz
 Bobby Joe Ebola and the Children MacNuggits
 Filth
 Larry and His Flask
 Pain
 The Phenomenauts
 The Pillowfights
 River City Rebels
 Shang-A-Lang
 Vic Ruggiero

Additionally, the label has released the following compilation albums:

 Rude Remix Revolution (2009)

Cartoonists 

 Ben Passmore published Your Black Friend and Other Strangers (2018)
 Benji Nate
 Cartoonist Mitch Clem publishes his work through Silver Sprocket.
 Liz Suburbia
 Eddy Atoms
 Jenn Woodall
 Caroline Cash

External links 
 
 Facebook
 Twitter
 Instagram

References 

Indie rock record labels
Punk record labels
American independent record labels
Record labels established in 2007
Comic book publishing companies of the United States
Publishing companies established in 2007